Nandan Bezbarua is a former cricketer who played first-class cricket for Assam from 1967 to 1979.

A middle-order and opening batsman, Bezbarua played four matches for Assam from 1966-67 to 1970-71 with little success, then returned to the team in 1974-75. In his third match that season he opened the batting and top-scored in each innings, although he made only 11 and 8 not out, and Assam totalled only 35 and 33 and lost to Bengal by an innings and 282 runs. In the second innings he carried his bat. He had his most successful season in 1977-78, scoring 121 runs at an average of 24.20, including his highest score of 59 (equal top score) against Bihar.

He captained Assam in his last season, 1979-80. He top-scored in the first innings of the first match with 29, and finished the season with 84 runs at 14.00 in Assam's three matches; Assam's highest scorer that season made 85 runs. He later served as honorary secretary of the Assam Cricket Association.

References

External links
 Nandan Bezbarua at CricketArchive
 Nandan Bezbarua at Cricinfo

Year of birth missing (living people)
Living people
Indian cricketers
Assam cricketers